Sir Herbert Smith, 1st Baronet (22 June 1872 – 14 July 1943), known as "Piggy" Smith, was an English carpet manufacturer.

Smith's business was based in Kidderminster. During the First World War he was chairman of the Carpet Trade Rationing Committee and the Man-Power and Protection Committee and was a member of the Board of Control of the Wool and Textile Industries. For these services he was created a baronet in the 1920 Birthday Honours.

From 1921 to 1938 he owned and lived at Witley Court, which partly burned down in 1937 and was never restored. He died at the age of 71 and was succeeded in the baronetcy by his son, also called Herbert.

Footnotes

See also
 Smith of Kidderminster baronets

References
Obituary, The Times, 17 July 1943

1872 births
1943 deaths
English businesspeople
Baronets in the Baronetage of the United Kingdom